Yves Locas (born October 1, 1938) is a Canadian retired professional hockey player who played for the Hershey Bears, Pittsburgh Hornets, Springfield Indians and Providence Reds in the American Hockey League.

External links
 

1938 births
Living people
Canadian ice hockey right wingers